Smith Stewart Hart (November 28, 1948 – July 2, 2017) was an American-Canadian professional wrestler and a member of the Hart wrestling family. His parents were Stu and Helen Hart. Smith was the first of their twelve children, being one of their eight sons, Bruce, Keith, Wayne, Dean, Bret, Ross and Owen followed him. Hart is also the father of two professional wrestlers, Mike and Matt Hart. Hart wrestled for the majority of his career in Canada but also worked briefly in other countries and is best known for his time in Stampede Wrestling and for his appearances for WWE. He died in 2017 due to prostate cancer.

Early life
Hart was born in New York and was a dual citizen of the United States and Canada.

He was of Greek descent through his maternal grandmother and Irish through his maternal grandfather. His father was mainly of Scots-Irish descent but also had Scottish and English ancestry.

When he was less than a year old his mother, Helen Hart, suffered an automobile accident while pregnant with his younger brother Bruce. As a result, he was sent to live with his maternal grandparents, Harry and Elizabeth Smith, for over two years.

Smith taught his younger brother Bret to draw.

Professional wrestling career

As a wrestler
He wrestled in his father's Stampede Wrestling promotion and in Puerto Rico's World Wrestling Council, as well as trips to Japan, England, Germany and the Netherlands. He also helped out behind the scenes at Stampede Wrestling.

Stampede, Japan and National Wrestling Alliance

In 1973 Hart debuted for his father's promotion Stampede Wrestling in a tag team match with Bob Pringle against Joe Tomasso and Super Hawk in Regina. He later went on that same year to working in matches with Frank Butcher. Late that year he also tag teamed with his brother Bruce against Frank Butcher and Kim Klokeid.

In 1974 Hart began working for the Japanese promotion International Wrestling Enterprise, he first worked in a match against Katsuzo Oiyama in Sagamihara. Hart was sent to Japan primarily to train since his father wanted him to get more experience and discipline. Hart's brother Bret has stated that Hart suffered through a lot of stress and was unhappy during this period. Hart has claimed that his time in Japan caused the breakup with his then girlfriend and mother of his first child, Marla.

From 1977 to 1980 Hart worked and wrestled in collaboration with Stampede Wrestling and the National Wrestling Alliance in matches against Gordon Ivey, Jim Custer and Steve Novak among others. In this period, he also was in a three-man tag team stable together with his brothers Bruce and Keith, they wrestled and defeated Bud Osborne, John Foley and Ray Osborne.

Stampede Wrestling and Universal Wrestling Promotions
In late 70s Hart traveled to Puerto Rico together with his younger brother Bret. They won the UWP Caribbean Tag Team Championship together. Hart met his wife Maria while working in Puerto Rico.

In the early 80s Hart worked for Stampede Wrestling where he mostly participated in singles matches against wrestlers such ad Otis Young, Bill Jodoin, T.G. Stone and Joe Tomasso but also in a lot of tag team matches with his brother Keith against people such as Kerry Brown and the Cuban Assassin. He also tag teamed with brother in-law Jim Neidhart regularly against Carlos Peron, José Peron, Duke Myers and Texas Red Miller. Outside of that he at times worked in three man tag teams with Dan Kroffat and Barabas were they competed with Fidel Castillo, José Peron and Carlos Peron.

Hart continued to wrestle in Puerto Rico and in Montreal in the late 80s after Stampede Wrestling was shut down and sold to WWE.

Independent circuit
On June 24, 2011 Hart wrestled for the Great North Wrestling promotion in a match which he lost against The Spoiler. On May 24, 2013 he returned once again to the ring at the Grange Hall arena in Lefroy, Ontario in a match for Pure Wrestling Association where he defeated Mad Braddock. He was there together with his step-son Mike who also wrestled at the event.

Appearances for WWF/E
At the 1994 SummerSlam event Hart and his brothers can be seen attempting to climb the cage in which Bret and Owen Hart had their match.

On March 28, 2010, Hart made an appearance at Wrestlemania 26 to help his brother Bret defeat Vince McMahon in a No Holds Barred Match. The storyline was that McMahon had paid off Smith and all the other Hart family members to betray Bret, but they all doublecrossed him and helped Bret win the match.

Hart also appeared on WWE television at his father Stu's Hall of Fame induction together with his sibling.

As a promoter

On November 6, 2011 Smith brought back Stampede Wrestling in Barrie, Ontario.

In February 2013 Smith became an executive member of the Victory Commonwealth Wrestling board of directors along with "Soulman" Ricky Johnson, uncle of Dwayne "The Rock" Johnson. He has since made many appearances for the company under both the VCW and Hogtown Pro Wrestling names.

In April 2014 Hart announced that David Benoit, the son of late wrestler Chris Benoit was to make his in ring debut for the Hart Legacy Wrestling promotion on July 18 in a tag team match with Chavo Guerrero. Hart claimed that Benoit had been trained by his nephew David Hart Smith. The match was later canceled in May when Chris Jericho informed Guerrero that David did not have any formal training. Hart had told different versions to the two men, to Guerrero he had said that David had received training for the match but had also told Jericho that David would not be wrestling, just involved in a storyline.

He was at one point booker for the Canadian-based Great North Wrestling company.

Other work in wrestling

Hart opened a "Hart Brothers Wrestling School" in Cambridge, Ontario which has trained many wrestlers including the Highlanders.

On November 19, 2013 Smith joined PWMania.com as a columnist.

Other media

In 2011 Hart appeared the Canadian show Dragon's Den, Season 6 Episode 4. Hart and his son Matt are the subjects of the documentary Hart Still Beating, directed by Fred Kroetsch and Kurt Spenrath.

Personal life

Family

Hart had several children including sons Matthew and Chad, daughters Toby McIvor and Satania Hart (nicknamed Tania). Smith's youngest son Chad was the one to receive Bret Hart's trademark sunglasses at the SummerSlam 1994 PPV. He also had two step-sons named Michael Herweg and Steven Jupe. Chad is named 'Dean' in middle name, after Smith's younger brother who died in 1990. Hart also has six grandchildren, three granddaughters from his oldest, Tobi, named Amanda, Jessica and Isabella, and two grandsons named Lakken and Ashwin Stelzner from his son Michael, who also has a stepdaughter named Havanna Stelzner.

Two of his sons, Michael and Matthew have started a career in wrestling. Both perform mainly in Canada on the independent scene, Mike wrestles mainly for the Pure Wrestling Association and Matt mainly for Real Canadian Wrestling and Canadian Wrestling's Elite.

On 15 March 2022, Hart's brother Bret announced that Tania had died.

Legal issues

In 1978, Hart was attending the Oktoberfest in Germany together with Tom Billington and his brother Bruce to represent Stampede Wrestling in an international wrestling tournament, when Hart was called out he entered the ring with a Hitler mustache and performed a Nazi salute in an attempt to play a joke on the other wrestlers.

After the Hart House was put up for sale following the death of Stu Hart in October 2003, Smith refused to move out and hid inside it. He had used the family mansion as a rent house to make money and was unwilling to give it up. Even after the doors and windows were barricaded he managed to enter through the balcony and had to eventually to be escorted out by police.

Hart is one of 96 known people on an Alberta Justice website who owe a combined $6.6 million in court-ordered Maintenance Enforcement Program (MEP) payments to spouses and children.

Illness and death
On January 21, 2016, Hart announced on his Twitter and Facebook profile that he had been diagnosed with both prostate and bone cancers. He was also in the progress of writing his autobiography. Two weeks later via his Facebook, his brother Bret Hart revealed that he had prostate cancer. Smith's cancer spread to his hip; when the disease is restricted to the prostate, the survival rate is rather high but Hart's initial cancer therapy was unsuccessful, requiring chemotherapy. By February 7, 2017, Hart had been diagnosed with terminal prostate cancer and given about one year left to live. On June 5, 2017, Smith Hart announced on his Facebook page that he had entered hospice care related to his cancer. On July 2, 2017, it was announced that Smith Hart had died at the age of 68 of prostate and bone cancer. A service of remembrance in Hart's honour was held at the Calgary Marlborough Community Association, 636 Marlborough Way N.E. Calgary, Alberta on Monday, July 10, 2017.

Championships and accomplishments
World Wrestling Council
WWC Caribbean Tag Team Championship (1 time) - with Bret Hart
Canadian Wrestling Hall of Fame
Class of 2001
 Prairie Wrestling Alliance
 Prairie Wrestling Alliance Hall of Fame (Class of 2010)
Totally Driven Entertainment
Totally Driven Hall of Fame (class of 2017)

References

Further reading
Book
 
 
 
Articles

External links

 
 Smith Hart Obituary Guest Book 1, 2, 3, 4, 5 at Legacy.com

1948 births
2017 deaths
20th-century professional wrestlers
American male professional wrestlers
Canadian male professional wrestlers
Deaths from bone cancer
Deaths from cancer in Alberta
Deaths from prostate cancer
Hart family members
Professional wrestling executives
Professional wrestling trainers
Professional wrestling promoters
Stampede Wrestling alumni
Sportspeople from Calgary
American sportspeople of Canadian descent
American people of Scotch-Irish descent
American people of English descent
American people of Greek descent
Canadian people of English descent
Canadian people of Greek descent
Canadian people of American descent
Canadian people of Ulster-Scottish descent